Andrew Stewart may refer to:

 Andrew Stewart, 1st Lord Avandale ( 1420–1488), Lord Chancellor of Scotland
 Andrew Stewart, 1st Lord Avondale (second creation) (died 1513), Scottish nobleman
 Andrew Stewart (bishop of Caithness, died 1517), Bishop of Caithness and Treasurer of Scotland
 Andrew Stewart (bishop of Moray) (1442–1501), Scottish prelate and administrator
 Andrew Stewart, 2nd Lord Avondale ( 1505–1549), Scottish peer
 Andrew Stewart (bishop of Caithness, died 1541) ( 1490–1541), Scottish noble and cleric
 Andrew Stewart, 2nd Lord Ochiltree ( 1521–1591)
 Andrew Stewart (minister) (1771–1838), Scottish physician and minister of the Church of Scotland
 Andrew Stewart (American politician, died 1872) (1791–1872), U.S. Representative from Pennsylvania
 Andrew Stewart (American politician, died 1903) (1836–1903), U.S. Representative from Pennsylvania
 Andrew Stewart (footballer), Scottish footballer in the 1890s
 Andrew Stewart (economist) (1904–1990), Scottish-born Canadian economist, university administrator, and first head of the Board of Broadcast Governors
 Charles Stewart (diplomat) (Andrew Charles Stewart, 1907–1979), British diplomat
 Andrew Stewart (British Army officer) (born 1952), British general
 Andrew Stewart, Lord Ericht (born 1963), Scottish judge, Senator of the College of Justice
 Andrew Stewart (gridiron football) (born 1965), American player of gridiron football

See also 
 Andrew Steuart, MP for Cambridge
 Andrew Stuart (disambiguation)
 Andy Stewart (disambiguation)